The Charlotte Observer is an American newspaper serving Charlotte, North Carolina, and its metro area. The Observer was founded in 1886.  As of 2020, it has the second-largest circulation of any newspaper in the Carolinas. It is owned by Chatham Asset Management.

Overview
The Observer primarily serves Charlotte and Mecklenburg County and the surrounding counties of Iredell, Cabarrus, Union, Lancaster, York, Gaston, Catawba, and Lincoln.  Home delivery service in outlying counties has declined in recent years, with delivery times growing later as the paper has outsourced circulation services outside the primary Charlotte area.

Circulation at The Charlotte Observer has been declining for many years. The period of May 2011 showed that Charlotte Observer circulation totaled 155,497 daily and 212,318 Sunday.  2017 Print Circulation Daily: 69,987 and Sunday: 106,434.

The newspaper has an online presence and its staff also oversees a NASCAR news website, and a corresponding syndicated feature, That's Racin'''. The Charlotte Observer also operates a food, drink and lifestyle vertical called CharlotteFive. The paper's television partner is WBTV.The Observer offices also include editors and designers that makeup the McClatchy NewsDesk-East, which is responsible for the production of The Charlotte Observer and McClatchy newspapers from across the region.

From 1927 to 2016, The Charlotte Observer was headquartered at 600 South Tryon Street. The facility included editorial offices, management offices, advertising offices, production, plus a large printing facility with a tunnel and underground railway system to feed paper to the presses. In 2016, the editorial offices moved to the NASCAR building on South Caldwell Street. The old facility was demolished and redeveloped into office space.

History
The paper was founded in 1886 as the Charlotte Chronicle. The Chronicle was sold to Joseph Caldwell in 1892, and began appearing as the Charlotte Daily Observer on March 13, 1892. It was purchased by Knight Newspapers in 1955.  Knight merged with Ridder Publications to form Knight Ridder in 1974. The Observer eventually became the fourth-largest newspaper in the Knight Ridder chain (behind The Philadelphia Inquirer and Daily News, Detroit Free Press and Miami Herald). In 1959, The Observer purchased The Charlotte News, Charlotte's afternoon newspaper.  All operations were merged except editorial content, which was fused in 1983. The Observer ended circulation of the afternoon News in 1985.

McClatchy purchased most of Knight Ridder's newspapers, including The Observer, in 2006. This made The Observer a sister publication of the state's largest paper, The News and Observer of Raleigh; and of The Herald of Rock Hill, the primary newspaper for the South Carolina side of the metro area. As of spring 2008, it is the fifth-largest newspaper in the McClatchy chain (behind The Kansas City Star, Miami Herald, Sacramento Bee and Fort Worth Star-Telegram). McClatchy's share value has been in decline since the purchase. The stock has lost over 95% of its value, far worse than many remaining newspaper companies.

On March 7, 2020, the Observer made the Saturday edition digital only.

Pulitzer Prizes

The Charlotte Observer has won five Pulitzer Prizes:
1968 – Editorial cartooning, Eugene Payne
1981 – Meritorious public service, staff; "For Brown Lung: A Case of Deadly Neglect, a hard-hitting look at the terrible health consequences workers suffered from cotton dust produced in the region's textile mills."
1988 – Editorial cartooning, Doug Marlette (shared with the Atlanta Constitution)
1988 – Meritorious public service, staff; "For its investigation into the misuse of funds by Jim and Tammy Faye Bakker and their PTL ministries."
2014 – Editorial cartooning, Kevin Siers

Prices
To date, the Charlotte Observer'' prices are: daily, $2 and Sunday/Thanksgiving Day, $3. Price is higher outside Mecklenburg & adjacent counties/states.  As of 2020, an annual digital subscription is $15.99 per month.

See also
 
 Jack Betts (journalist), past member of editorial board 
 List of newspapers in North Carolina
 Richard Oppel, Editor (1978–1993)

References

External links

Charlotte Five

Mass media in Charlotte, North Carolina
McClatchy publications
Knight Ridder publications
Pulitzer Prize-winning newspapers
Publications established in 1886
1886 establishments in North Carolina
Pulitzer Prize for Public Service winners
Daily newspapers published in North Carolina